Claude-François Baudez (3 December 1932 – 13 July 2013) was a French Mayanist, archaeologist and iconologist. He was honorary director of research at the French National Centre for Scientific Research, a specialist on the rituals and beliefs of Mesoamerica, particularly of the Maya civilisation.

Career 
In his early years, Claude-François Baudez studied the little-known remains of Mesoamerican civilisations in Costa Rica and Honduras. Since 1971, he has devoted himself mainly to research on the Maya culture. He was co-director of French excavations at the Toniná archaeological site in Mexico, and led the Copán exploration and restoration programme, while studying its sculpture.

Research chronicle 
 1957-1960 Costa Rica: Investigations at the Papagayo site in the Valley of Tempisque.
 1964-1965 Honduras: Investigations in the Gulf of Fonseca region and in the Valley of Comayagua.
 1967-1969 Honduras: Excavation at the archaeological region Los Naranjos (in collaboration with ).
 1971-1973 Mexico: Excavation at the Toniná site (in collaboration with Pierre Becquelin).
 1977-1980 Honduras: Direction of the Copán Archaeological Project.
 1981-1984 Honduras: Annual stays in Copán for in-situ study of its sculptures.
 1989 Mexico: Stay in Palenque for in-situ studies of its sculptures.
 1990 Costa Rica: Excavations at the Diquís Delta.
 1994 Mexico: Iconographic studies at Balamku.

Selected bibliography 

 Recherches Archéologiques dans la vallée du Tempisque, Guanacaste, Costa Rica, Travaux et Mémoires de l’Institut des Hautes Études de l’Amérique Latine, 1967
 Amérique Centrale, collection « Archaeologia Mundi ». Nagel Publishers, 1970
 Co-author with Pierre Becquelin, Le monde précolombien : Les Mayas, collection « L’Univers des Formes » (nº 31). Éditions Gallimard, 1984
 Co-author with Sydney Picasso, Les cités perdues des Mayas, collection « Découvertes Gallimard » (nº 20), série Archéologie. Éditions Gallimard, 1987 (new edition in 2008)
 US edition – Lost Cities of the Maya, “Abrams Discoveries” series. Harry N. Abrams, 1992
 UK edition – Lost Cities of the Maya, ‘New Horizons’ series. Thames & Hudson, 1992
 Jean-Frédéric Waldeck, peintre : le premier explorateur des ruines mayas, Hazan, 1993
 Maya Sculpture of Copán: The Iconography,  University of Oklahoma Press, 1994
 Une histoire de la religion des Mayas : Du panthéisme au panthéon, collection « Bibliothèque Albin Michel de l’histoire ». Éditions Albin Michel, 2002
 Una historia de la religión de los antiguos Mayas, UNAM, 2004
 Les Mayas, Paris, Les Belles Lettres, 2004 (collection « Guide Belles Lettres des civilisations »).
 La douleur rédemptrice. L'autosacrifice précolombien, Paris, Riveneuve éditions, 2012.

References 

1932 births
2013 deaths
Mayanists
French archaeologists
Mesoamerican archaeologists
20th-century Mesoamericanists